Lee Min-jung (born February 16, 1982) is a South Korean actress. She began her career in Jang Jin's stage plays, and for a few years appeared in supporting roles on film and television. She became known after her appearance in Boys Over Flowers (2009), and landed her first lead role in family drama Smile, You (2009). Lee achieved widespread recognition for her leading role in the romantic comedy Cyrano Agency (2010). She also starred in Wonderful Radio (2012), Big (2012), Cunning Single Lady (2014) and Come Back Mister (2016). She recently starred and gained recognition in the KBS weekend drama, Once Again.

Career
Lee began her career in playwright/filmmaker Jang Jin's stage plays, then appeared in the Christian-themed indie Pruning the Grapevine, while doing minor roles on film and television. She became a household name in 2009 through her supporting role in the popular high school series Boys Over Flowers, which then landed her first leading role in the weekend drama Smile, You. The same year, she won the Best New Actress award at the Korean Association of Film Critics Awards for her performance in the mystery thriller White Night.

Lee's breakout role was in romantic comedy Cyrano Agency in 2010, where she swept Best New Actress awards at various local award-giving bodies.

Commercials and endorsements flooded in, and Lee gained a "goddess" label in the press. One of the challenges of her next film Wonderful Radio, was to strip her of that image. She successfully carried the film, with one review praising her as "expertly swinging from girly ditz, through self-centered pop diva (with memorable temper tantrums), to serious singer-songwriter." Co-star Lee Jung-jin said her actual personality is similar to the character's - "really upbeat and outgoing."

After playing a disillusioned fiancée to an ambitious fund manager in Midas, Lee returned to the romantic comedy genre in the body-swapping TV series Big written by the Hong sisters. In 2013 she starred in another rom-com series All About My Romance, about a secret relationship between two politicians of rival parties. This was followed by Cunning Single Lady in 2014, in which she played the titular character who schemes to win her ex-husband back now that he's rich and successful.

Lee made her acting comeback after three years in the SBS drama Come Back Mister with Rain. The series began airing in February 2016, and Lee won positive reviews for her performance.

In 2018, Lee returned with a SBS weekend drama Fates & Furies. She re-united with her former co-star Joo Sang-wook from Cunning Single Lady as main leads. In 2020, Lee gained widespread recognition portraying the role of Song Na-hee alongside actor Lee Sang-yeob in the weekend drama, Once Again.

Personal life
Her maternal grandfather was renowned painter Park No-soo, who led the first generation of modern traditional Korean ink painters which emerged after the country's liberation from Japanese rule. Park died on February 25, 2013, at the age of 86.

Lee married actor Lee Byung-hun on August 10, 2013, at the Grand Hyatt Seoul. The couple had briefly dated in 2006, then resumed their relationship in 2012. She gave birth to their first child, Lee Joon-hoo, a boy, on March 31, 2015.

Filmography

Film

Television series

Web series

Television shows

Music video appearances

Theater

Discography

Awards and nominations

State honors

Listicles

References

External links 

 
 
 
 

South Korean television actresses
South Korean film actresses
South Korean stage actresses
1982 births
Living people
People from Seoul
Actresses from Seoul
21st-century South Korean actresses
Sungkyunkwan University alumni